Peter N. Kirsanow (born October 30, 1953) is a partner with the law firm of Benesch, Friedlander, Coplan & Aronoff, working within its Labor & Employment Practice Group in Cleveland, Ohio.  He is a black civil-rights commissioner and a member of the United States Commission on Civil Rights (a part-time appointment), serving his fourth consecutive 6-year term, which he was reappointed to by House Majority Leader Steny Hoyer in December 2019. He is the longest-serving member among the current commission. He was previously a member of the National Labor Relations Board (NLRB) from January 2006 to January 2008.

Education
Kirsanow received his Bachelor of Arts from Cornell University in 1976 and then in 1979 received his Juris Doctor cum laude from the Cleveland State University College of Law, where he served as articles editor of the Cleveland State Law Review.

Career
Kirsanow served as labor counsel for the City of Cleveland and as senior labor counsel of Leaseway Transportation Corp.

Kirsanow was appointed to the U.S. Commission on Civil Rights by President George W. Bush in December 2001, but Chairwoman Mary Frances Berry told the White House that it would take federal marshals to seat Kirsanow, fighting his appointment all the way to the U.S. Supreme Court. In May 2002, the United States Department of Justice prevailed in its lawsuit to seat Kirsanow as a member of the Commission. He was re-appointed by President Bush to serve a second six-year term on the commission, and then re-appointed once more by U.S. House Speaker Paul Ryan.

President Bush appointed Kirsanow to the five-member NLRB in 2006 for two years, where he was involved with significant decisions including Oakwood Healthcare, Inc., Dana/Metaldyne and Oil Capital Sheet Metal, Inc. In 2008, Kirsanow returned to the Cleveland law firm of Benesch Friedlander Coplan & Aronoff LLP, where he is a partner with the firm's Labor & Employment Practice Group and a member of the Diversity & Inclusion Committee. He represents management in employment-related litigation, contract negations, NLRB proceedings and EEO matters.

Kirsanow has written articles for National Review since 2003. Kirsanow testified before the Senate Judiciary Committee on the nominations of John Roberts, Samuel Alito, Sonia Sotomayor and Elena Kagan to the Supreme Court, and at the confirmation hearing for Jeff Sessions nomination for United States Attorney General.

Bar admissions and associations
Ohio, 1979
U.S. District Court for the Northern District of Ohio, 1984
U.S. Court of Appeals, District of Columbia Circuit

Memberships
Past Chair of the Board of Directors, The Center for New Black Leadership
Member of the Advisory Board of the National Center for Public Policy Research
Adjunct Professor, Cleveland State University, Cleveland-Marshall College of Law, 1992-1993
Member, National Labor Relations Board, 2006-2008
Commissioner, U.S. Commission on Civil Rights, 2002-

Books
"Target Omega" (2017)
"Second Strike" (2018)

References

External links

Peter Kirsanow at SourceWatch
Profiles of the U.S. Civil Rights Commission Commissioners
Press release about Kirsanow's returning to private practice

1953 births
Cleveland–Marshall College of Law alumni
Cornell University alumni
Living people
National Labor Relations Board officials
Ohio Republicans
Lawyers from Cleveland
United States Commission on Civil Rights members